The Boston 10K for Women, Presented by REI, formerly known as the Reebok Boston 10K for Women, Tufts Health Plan 10K for Women and the Bonne Bell Mini Marathon, is a major 10 kilometer (6.2 mi) road race held annually in Boston, Massachusetts, on Columbus Day. It is popular as both an elite world-class competition and a women's running event promoting health and fitness. Each year, the race draws thousands of participants and nearly 20,000 spectators.

History
For many years, the race has doubled as the USA Women's 10 km Championship (USA Track & Field). It has attracted many of the world's top distance runners, including Olympic gold medalist Joan Benoit Samuelson and Olympian Molly Huddle, who each won four times, and Olympic bronze medalist Lynn Jennings, a six-time winner.

Begun in 1977 as the Bonne Bell Mini Marathon, Tufts Health Plan became title sponsor in 1985 and supported the race for 33 years. In 2018, Reebok took up the sponsorship of the race, and in 2021, REI became the presenting sponsor of the event. For several years it was the largest women-only 10K in the US, most recently in 2013.

In the 2018 race, Emily Sisson's time does not count as a course record as an off-course public safety issue caused the race course to be adjusted after it had begun, and was approximately 300 meters short.

In 2020 the in-person race was cancelled due to the COVID-19 pandemic and became a virtual event in which more than 2,000 participants registered and ran around the world.

When the race resumed in 2021, now presented by REI, Weini Kelati set a new course record and American record with a time of 31:18.

Course
The race course starts on Beacon Street near the Boston Common, crosses the Charles River via the Massachusetts Avenue Bridge into Cambridge near the Massachusetts Institute of Technology, forms a loop along the river on Memorial Drive, and crosses back over the bridge and into Boston down brownstone-lined Commonwealth Avenue. The finish line on Charles Street returns the runners to the Boston Common for celebration.

Runners
The race has become a Boston tradition and there are at least 10 women who have run the race every year since its inception in 1977.

Winners

References

List of winners

External links
Official website

10K runs in the United States
1977 in Boston
1977 establishments in Massachusetts
Annual sporting events in the United States
History of Cambridge, Massachusetts
Recurring sporting events established in 1977
Sports competitions in Boston
Sports in Cambridge, Massachusetts
Tourist attractions in Cambridge, Massachusetts
Women's athletics competitions
Women's sports in Massachusetts
Women in Boston